Kielder Water  is a large man-made reservoir in Northumberland in North East England.  It is the largest artificial lake in the United Kingdom by capacity of water and it is surrounded by Kielder Forest, one of the biggest man-made woodlands in Europe. The scheme was planned in the late 1960s to satisfy an expected rise in demand for water to support a booming UK industrial economy.

Kielder Water is owned by Northumbrian Water, and holds 200 billion litres (44 billion gallons, or 0.2 cubic km), making it the largest artificial reservoir in the UK by capacity (Rutland Water is the largest by surface area).

Etymology
The name Kielder was first recorded in 1309 as Keldre. Originating as a river name, Kielder may have the same origin as the various rivers named Calder, such as the one in West Yorkshire. The name may be derived from the Brittonic caleto-/ā, with the root sense of "hard" (Welsh caled), suffixed with -duβr meaning "water" (Welsh dwr).

Derivation from the Gaelic caol dobhar meaning "narrow stream" has also been suggested.

Construction

After the scheme was approved by Parliament in 1974, work to build the reservoir and the dam at the hamlet of Yarrow in the Kielder Valley began in 1975. The reservoir and dam were designed for Northumbrian Water by consulting civil engineers Babtie, Shaw and Morton. Sir Frederick Gibberd and Partners  were responsible for architectural aspects. Earth moving and infrastructure construction was undertaken in a joint venture with AMEC and Balfour Beatty.

The design meant the loss of numerous farms and a school. About 95 people had been resident in the area prior to its development. The former permanent way of the Border Counties Railway was also taken away through the development of the reservoir.

Work was completed in 1981. Queen Elizabeth II officially opened the project the following year. The valley took a further two years to fill with water completely.

Hydroelectric plant
Kielder Water is also the site of England's largest hydroelectric plant. It was opened by Queen Elizabeth II on 26 May 1982 and is owned by Northumbrian Water. In December 2005, RWE Npower Renewables bought the rights to operate the plant and sell the electricity generated by it, with a contract lasting until 2025. Following the takeover, the turbines were refurbished in 2005–2006, which increased the efficiency of the electricity generation. Controls were also updated, so that the plant can be operated from Dolgarrog in Wales.

The plant generates electricity using dual turbines which produce 6 megawatts of electricity. This comes from a combination of a 5.5 MW Kaplan turbine, which generates electricity when water release takes place, and a 500 kW Francis turbine that generates constantly from the compensation flow of water from the reservoir into the North Tyne. This gives the reservoir an average production of 20,000 MWh of electricity per year, a saving of 8,500 tonnes of carbon dioxide per year compared to fossil fuel based methods of generation.

Operations
The reservoir's main use is to provide compensating discharges into the River North Tyne to support abstractions of water further downstream. It also underpins the £167m Kielder Transfer Scheme, where water can be transferred to the Wear and the Tees rivers, to meet shortfalls in those areas. In recent years, Kielder Water has become increasingly important, with underground springs ensuring that it always remains at high levels, regardless of the prevailing climate condition. This means that while the south of England is often forced to implement drought strategies and hosepipe bans, north-east England enjoys plentiful water supplies.

There are two main visitor centres at Kielder Water – Leaplish waterside park and Tower Knowe visitor centre – and other facilities at Kielder, Falstone and Stannersburn villages. It is also one of the region's major tourist venues, attracting more than 250,000 visitors a year who come to enjoy the facilities.

Notes

Citations

References

External links

Kielder Water Sailing Club
Fishing on Kielder Water

Drinking water reservoirs in England
Reservoirs in Northumberland
Hydroelectric power stations in England
Buildings and structures in Northumberland
Power stations in North East England
River regulation in England
RKielder